Gratitude, thankfulness, or gratefulness is from the Latin word gratus, which means "pleasing" or "thankful." Is regarded as a feeling of appreciation (or similar positive response) by a recipient of another's kindness. This can be gifts, help, favors, or another form of generosity to another person. The absence of gratitude where gratitude is expected is called ingratitude or ungratefulness. Historically, gratitude has been a part of several world religions. It also has been a topic of interest to ancient, medieval, and modern philosophers.

The study of gratitude in psychology has included an attempt to understand the short term experience of the gratitude response (state gratitude), individual differences in how frequently gratitude is felt among individuals (trait gratitude), and the relationship between these two. The therapeutic benefits of gratitude have also been taken into consideration.

Comparison with indebtedness
Some assert that gratitude is not the same as indebtedness. While both emotions may occur in response to help or favors, indebtedness occurs when an individual perceives that they are under an obligation to provide repayment or compensation for the aid. The emotions lead to different actions; indebtedness may motivate the recipient to avoid the person who helped them, whereas gratitude may motivate a recipient to seek out their benefactor and to improve their relationship with them. An example can be seen in a study undertaken to observe the feelings of migrant adolescents towards their parents. In the study, it was noted that "gratitude serves and indebtedness challenges intergenerational relations after migration". In this study it was also noted that, "when the expectations of return from the benefactor increase, indebtedness of the beneficiary increases but gratitude decreases".

Religious approaches 

The link between spirituality and gratitude has recently become a popular subject of study. While these two characteristics are certainly not dependent on each other, studies have found that spirituality is capable of enhancing a person's ability to be grateful. Therefore, those who regularly attend religious services or engage in religious activities are more likely to have a greater sense of gratitude in all areas of life. Gratitude is viewed as a prized human propensity in the Christian, Buddhist, Muslim, Jewish, Baháʼí, and Hindu traditions. Worship with gratitude to God, or similar religious figure, is a common theme in such religions and the concept of gratitude permeates religious texts, teachings, and traditions. For this reason, it is one of the most common emotions that religions aim to evoke and maintain in followers and is regarded as a universal religious sentiment.

Jewish conceptions 

In Judaism, gratitude is an essential part of the act of worship and a part of every aspect of a worshipper's life. According to the Hebrew worldview, all things come from God and, because of this, gratitude is extremely important to the followers of Judaism. The Hebrew Scriptures are filled with the idea of gratitude. Two examples included in the psalms are "O Lord my God, I will give thanks to you forever", and "I will give thanks to the Lord with my whole heart"  (Ps. 30:12; Ps. 9:1). Jewish prayers also often incorporate gratitude, beginning with the Shema, where the worshipper states that out of gratitude, "You shall love the Eternal, your God, with all your heart, with all your soul, and with all your might" (Deut. 6:5). One of the crucial blessings in the central thrice-daily prayer, the Amidah, is called Modim – "We give thanks to You"; this is also the only blessing that is recited by the congregation together with the leader during their repetition of the Amidah. The concluding prayer, the Alenu, also speaks of gratitude by thanking God for the particular destiny of the Jewish people. Along with these prayers, faithful worshippers recite more than one hundred blessings, called berachot, throughout the day. In Judaism there is also a major emphasis on gratitude for acts of human kindness and goodness.

Christian conceptions 

Gratitude has been said to mold and shape the entire Christian life. Martin Luther referred to gratitude as "the basic Christian attitude" and today it is still referred to as "the heart of the gospel". Christians are strongly encouraged to praise and give gratitude to their creator. In Christian gratitude, God is seen as the selfless giver of all good things and, because of this, there is a deep sense of gratefulness that enables Christians to share a common bond, shaping all aspects of a follower's life. Gratitude in Christianity is an acknowledgement of God's generosity that inspires Christians to shape their own thoughts and actions around such ideals. Instead of simply a sentimental feeling, Christian gratitude is regarded as a virtue that shapes not only emotions and thoughts, but also actions and deeds.
Jonathan Edwards writes in his book A Treatise Concerning Religious Affections that gratitude and thankfulness toward God are among the signs of true religion. Because of this interpretation, modern measures of religious spirituality include assessments of thankfulness and gratitude towards God. Allport (1950) suggested that mature religious intentions come from feelings of profound gratitude; Edwards (1746/1959) claimed that the "affection" of gratitude is one of the most accurate ways of finding the presence of God in a person's life. In a study done by Samuels and Lester (1985) it was contended that in a small sample of Catholic nuns and priests, out of 50 emotions, love and gratitude were the most experienced emotion towards God. 
Finally, in the Orthodox, Catholic, Lutheran, and Anglican churches, the most important rite is called the Eucharist; the name derives from the Greek word Eucharistic, meaning thanksgiving.

Islamic conceptions 
The Islamic sacred text, the Quran, is filled with the idea of gratitude. Islam encourages its followers to be grateful and express thanks to Allah in all circumstances. Islamic teaching emphasizes the idea that those who are grateful will be rewarded with more. A traditional Islamic saying states that "The first who will be summoned to paradise are those who have praised God in every circumstance." In the Quran it is also stated in Sura 14 that those who are grateful will be given more by Allah. Many practices of the Islamic faith also encourage gratitude. For example, the Pillar of Islam calling for daily prayer encourages believers to pray to Allah five times a day in order to thank him for his goodness, and the pillar of fasting during the month of Ramadan is for the purpose of putting the believer in a state of gratitude.

Individual differences in gratitude 
Much of the recent work in research into gratitude has focused on the nature of individual differences in gratitude and the consequences of being a more or less grateful person. Three scales have been developed to measure individual differences in gratitude, each of which assesses somewhat different conceptions. The GQ6 measures individual differences in how frequently and intensely people feel gratitude. The Appreciation Scale measures eight different aspects of gratitude: appreciation of people, possessions, the present moment, rituals, feelings of awe, social comparisons, existential concerns, and behavior which expresses gratitude. The GRAT assesses gratitude towards other people, gratitude towards the world in general, and a lack of resentment for what you lack. A recent study showed that these scales are actually all measuring the same way of approaching life; this suggests that individual differences in gratitude include all of these components.

Empirical findings

Association with well-being

Gratitude is foundational to well-being and mental health. Evidence has shown that there are psychological and physical benefits associated with gratitude. It has been shown to contribute to not only positive affect and other life outcomes, but also to a decrease in negative affect. A large body of work in the early 21st century has suggested that people who are more grateful have higher levels of subjective well-being. Grateful people are happier, less depressed, less stressed, and more satisfied with their lives and social relationships. They are found to be more joyful in the long term. Specifically, in terms of depression, gratitude may serve as a buffer by enhancing the coding and retrievability of positive experiences. Grateful people also have higher levels of control over their environments, personal growth, purpose in life, self-acceptance, as well as more positive ways of coping with the difficulties they experience in life. They are more likely to seek support from other people, reinterpret and grow from experiences, and they spend more time planning how to deal with problems. Likewise, grateful people have fewer negative coping strategies. They are less likely to try to avoid problems, deny there is a problem, blame themselves, or cope through substance use. Such people also sleep better because they think more positive thoughts just before going to sleep.  They also tend to have better relationships because a person's gratitude can protect the relationship satisfaction of their partner. Overall, numerous studies suggest that grateful people are more likely to have higher levels of happiness and lower levels of stress and depression.

Although many emotions and personality traits are important to the well-being and mental health, there is evidence that gratitude may be uniquely important. First, a longitudinal study showed that people who were more grateful coped better with a life transition. Specifically, people who were more grateful before the transition were less stressed, less depressed, and more satisfied with their relationships three months later. Second, two recent studies have suggested that gratitude may have a unique relationship with well-being and can explain aspects of well-being that other personality traits cannot. Both studies showed that gratitude was able to explain more well-being than the Big Five and 30 of the most commonly studied personality traits.

Gratitude has also been shown to foster physical health. For example, in one study, if teens wrote letters of gratitude to other people over a month, they were more inclined to eat healthier food. Arguably, when people feel grateful, they feel an obligation to reciprocate the efforts of other individuals. Therefore, rather than indulge and sacrifice their own health—a behavior that would dismiss the efforts that other individuals invested in them—they may feel compelled to live a healthier life. Also, gratitude tends to elicit positive emotions, and these positive emotions tend to focus attention on favorable possibilities in the future. Individuals become more inclined to engage in behaviors that could benefit this future, such as healthy eating. Likewise, individuals who express gratitude also demonstrate improved overall health by way of greater physical activity, better sleep, fewer health care visits, and better nutrition. In addition, practicing gratitude may be correlated with small improvements in cardiovascular health.

Relationship to altruism
Gratitude has also been shown to improve a person's altruistic tendencies. One study conducted by David DeSteno and Monica Bartlett (2010) found that gratitude is correlated with economic generosity. In this study, which used an economic game, increased gratitude was shown to directly mediate increased monetary giving. From these results, this study shows that grateful people are more likely to sacrifice individual gains for communal profit. A study conducted by McCullough, Emmons, & Tsang (2002) found similar correlations between gratitude and empathy, generosity, and helpfulness towards the creation of social reciprocity even with strangers that is beneficial to the individuals in the short and in the middle terms.

As a motivator of behavior

Gratitude may also serve to reinforce future prosocial behavior in benefactors. For example, one experiment found that customers of a jewelry store who were called and thanked showed a subsequent 70% increase in purchases. In comparison, customers who were called and told about a sale showed only a 30% increase in purchases, while customers who were not called at all showed no increase in purchases. Here, the gratitude expressed by thanking the customer resulted in a significant increase in sales for the store. In another study, a restaurant's regular patrons gave bigger tips when servers wrote "Thank you" on their checks. In both cases, even simple expressions of gratitude led the benefactors to react favorably. The evidence of gratitude increasing prosocial behaviors is highly supported as it plays a very central role in guiding how good social behavior should be practiced. This is because it teaches people to accept losses that are short term so that they can receive long term rewards which in turn teaches them better skills to life and social living.

Psychological interventions

Given that gratitude appears to be a strong determinant of people's well-being, several psychological interventions have been developed to increase gratitude. For example, Watkins and colleagues had participants test a number of different gratitude exercises, such as thinking about a living person for whom they are grateful, writing about someone for whom they are grateful, and writing a letter to deliver to someone for whom they are grateful. Participants in the control group were asked to describe their living room. Participants who engaged in a gratitude exercise showed increases in their experiences of positive emotion immediately after the exercise, and this effect was strongest for participants who were asked to think about a person for whom they are grateful. Participants who had grateful personalities to begin with showed the greatest benefit from these gratitude exercises. In another study concerning gratitude, participants were randomly assigned to one of six therapeutic intervention conditions designed to improve the participants' overall quality of life. Out of these conditions, it was found that the biggest short-term effects came from a "gratitude visit" where participants wrote and delivered a letter of gratitude to someone in their life. This condition showed a rise in happiness scores by 10 percent and a significant fall in depression scores, results that lasted up to one month after the visit. Out of the six conditions, the longest-lasting effects were associated with the act of writing "gratitude journals" where participants were asked to write down three things they were grateful for every day. These participants' happiness scores also increased and continued to increase each time they were tested periodically after the experiment. In fact, the greatest benefits were usually found to occur around six months after treatment began. This exercise was so successful that although participants were only asked to continue the journal for a week, many participants continued to keep the journal long after the study was over. Similar results have been found from studies conducted by Emmons and McCullough (2003) and Lyubomirsky et al. (2005). Recently (2013), the Greater Good Science Center at the University of California, Berkeley, has been offering awards for dissertation-level research projects with the greatest potential to advance the science and practice of gratitude.

Relationship to mental health 
A study of approximately 300 college students was conducted to determine the benefits of mental health counseling. Recruited participants were divided into three groups prior to their first counseling session. The first group was instructed to write one letter of gratitude a week for three weeks, the second group was asked to write about their negative experiences, and the third group received only counseling. When compared, the first group reported better mental health after completing their writing exercises. This finding suggests that gratitude writing may improve mental health. Although not conclusive, the study suggests that practicing gratitude may help the brain react more sensitively to the experience of gratitude in the future, and therefore, may improve mental health.

Conclusions
According to Cicero, "Gratitude is not only the greatest of the virtues but the parent of all others."  According to Immanuel Kant, "Ingratitude is the essence of vileness." Multiple studies have shown the correlation between gratitude and increased well being not only for the individual but for all people involved. The positive psychology movement has embraced these studies and, in an effort to increase overall well-being, has begun to make an effort to incorporate exercises to increase gratitude into the movement. Although in the past gratitude has been neglected by psychology, in recent years much progress has been made in studying gratitude and its positive effects.

Further reading

 "Gratitude," in the Stanford Encyclopedia of Philosophy..
 A Network for Grateful Living, founded by Br. David Steindl-Rast.
 "How I found Gratitude in a Bowl of Stew by Chad Daniels.
  Description & contents, summarizing scientific studies.
 
 Kristi Nelson (2020). Wake Up Grateful: The Transformative Practice of Taking Nothing for Granted. .
 Emmons, R.A. (2016). The Little Book of Gratitude: Create a Life of Happiness and Well-Being By Giving Thanks. London: Gaia. 2016 .
 Emmons, Robert A. (2013) Gratitude Works!: A Twenty-One-Day Program for Creating Emotional Prosperity. San Francisco : Jossey-Bass, 2013 .
 Emmons, R.A. (2007). THANKS! How the New Science of Gratitude Can Make You Happier. Boston, MA: Houghton-Mifflin.  (reprinted in paperback titled THANKS! How Practicing Gratitude Can Make You Happier New York: Mariner Books, 2008 ). Translated into French as Merci ! : quand la gratitude change nos vies, Turkish as Teşekkür ederim, and Chinese as 愈感恩, 愈富足 /Yu gan en, yu fu zu.
 Emmons, R.A. & Hill, J. (2001). Words of gratitude for mind, body, and soul. Radnor, PA: Templeton Foundation Press.
 Emmons, R.A. (1999). The psychology of ultimate concerns: Motivation and spirituality in personality. New York: The Guilford Press..

See also 
 Praise
 Universal value
 Gratitude journal
 Gratitude trap

References

External links 

 
Positive mental attitude
Emotions
Positive psychology